"Underclass Hero" is the first single from Sum 41's fourth studio album of the same name. The song impacted radio on May 15, 2007. The song in its entirety was leaked on April 23 from a 91X podcast interview with Deryck Whibley. It was confirmed on Sum 41's official site that this would be the opening track for the album.  The song was used in the EA Sports computer game Madden 08 and Sony's NBA 08. It is the band's first single since the departure of guitarist Dave Baksh.

Overview
"Underclass Hero" was written by Whibley in 2003 with a theme of "us against them", similar to their previous lyrics. Although "Underclass Hero" is written from a different angle, the song refers prominently to society and the struggle of "high-class versus the underclass" instead of "youth against adults" as in All Killer No Filler. The song also uses the more classic punk-rock themes of anti-establishment. This is the theme song for MTV's Crash My School. The song's intro is similar to the band's previous single, "Handle This", but with certain modifications in the notes and tuning.

The chorus of "Underclass Hero" reuses the chorus from the unfinished version of "No Reason", that originally appeared on the band's 2004 album Chuck and was released as a bonus track, titled "Subject to Change".

Critical reception
Andrew Blackie of PopMatters cited the song as an example of "on[e of] those rare occasions when the trio do shut up and honestly play with as much zest as they can muster, which can thus be spoken about with half-hearted approval". Dave de Sylvia of Sputnikmusic compared the song to "Fat Lip", referring to it as a "less rhythmic variation".

Music video
Sum 41's video for “Underclass Hero” was premiered May 29, 2007, on their official website. It shows the band playing behind a large group of teenagers, fireworks, a marching-band and bonfire, supposedly a pre-high school pep rally for a football game with a mascot, which represented the anarchy symbol. The video was launched worldwide on May 31, 2007, on Total Request Live on MTV. The video was co-directed by Marc Klasfeld and Sum 41's drummer, Steve Jocz. This is Sum 41's first video without their former guitarist Dave Baksh, who had left the band the previous year, but returned in 2015.

The music video garnered Sum 41 a nomination at the 2008 MTV Video Music Awards Japan in the category for Best Group Video.

Track listings and formats
CD single
"Underclass Hero"  – 3:14
"This Is Goodbye"  – 2:28
"March of the Dogs"  – 3:09
"Road to Run #4" (Webisode)
"Underclass Hero" (Video)

Credits and personnel
 Deryck Whibley – writer, producer, guitar, vocals, keyboards, piano
 Steve "Stevo" Jocz – drums, percussion
 Jason "Cone" McCaslin – bass
 Doug McKean – engineering
 David Campbell – string arrangement
 Jamie Muhoberac – keyboards
 Dan Chase – percussion
 Michael Railton – piano
 Chris Lord-Alge – mixing
 Nik Karpen – mixing assistance
 Keith Armstrong – mixing assistance

Credits and personnel adapted from Underclass Hero album liner notes.

Charts

References

External links

2007 singles
Music videos directed by Marc Klasfeld
Sum 41 songs
Songs written by Deryck Whibley
Songs written by Steve Jocz
2007 songs
Island Records singles